Get Away, Jordan is a live CD/DVD released by Christian gospel quartet Ernie Haase & Signature Sound. The album was produced by Gaither Music Group and released on January 23, 2007.

Track listing

 "Someday" (Moscheo) - 2:30
 "He's My Guide" (Isaacs) - 2:24
 "Lovest Thou Me (More Than These?)" (Gaither) - 3:08
 "John in the Jordan" (Golden, Salley) - 2:59
 "He Made a Change" (Ernie Haase, Lindsey) - 3:44
 "Until We Fly Away" (Lindsey, Thum) - 3:24
 "Beyond the Blues" (Lindsey, Silvey) - 3:09
 "It Is Done" (Ferguson, Smith) - 4:16
 "Our Debts Will Be Paid" (Weatherington) - 2:52
 "Get Away, Jordan" (Traditional) - 2:52
 "Happy Birthday, Anniversary Too" (Gaither, Haase) - 2:10
 "I Pledge My Allegiance" (Gaither, Gaither) - 4:34
 "The Star-Spangled Banner" (Francis Scott Key, John Stafford Smith) - 2:23
 "Oh, What a Savior" (Dalton) - 5:42
 "The Plan of Salvation" (Moody) - 4:25
 "Get Away, Jordan" (Traditional) - 7:28

DVD track listing

 "Someday"
 "He's My Guide"
 "Our Debts Will Be Paid"
 "Lovest Thou Me (More Than These?)"
 "Dem Bones"
 "He Made A Change"
 "Happy Birthday, Anniversary Too"
 "I Sing The Might Power Of God" (featuring the Ball Brothers)
 "It Is Done"
 "Pray For Me"
 "Get Away, Jordan"
 "Search Me, Lord" (featuring the Gaither Vocal Band)
 "Home" (featuring the Gaither Vocal Band)
 "He Touched Me" (featuring Ernie Haase & Signature Sound and Gaither Vocal Band)
 "John In The Jordan"
 "I Pledge My Allegiance"
 "The Star-Spangled Banner"
 "God Bless America"
 "What God Says"
 "Until We Fly Away"
 "Softly And Tenderly" (featuring Roy Webb on piano)
 "Oh, What A Savior"

Awards

The album won a Dove Award for Southern Gospel Album of the Year at the 39th GMA Dove Awards. The DVD version was also nominated for Long Form Music Video of the Year, and the title song was nominated for Southern Gospel Recorded Song of the Year.

References

External links
Get Away, Jordan on Amazon.com
Ernie Haase Interview on Southern Gospel Blog

2007 albums